Eslamlu may refer to:
 Eslamlu, Fars, a village in Fars Province, Iran
 Eslamlu, Oshnavieh, West Azerbaijan Province
 Eslamlu, Urmia, West Azerbaijan Province